Fenian (foaled 1866) was a Thoroughbred racehorse who won the 1869 Belmont Stakes. Bred by August Belmont, Fenian raced as a two-year-old, winning two races, placing second twice, and third once from five starts. As a three-year-old he only raced once, in the Belmont, which he won. He suffered from bad legs and some accounts state that he never raced again after the Belmont, although he appears to have raced later as a gelding, and eventually ended up in England where he did some steeplechase races. His likeness is atop the trophy for the Belmont Stakes.

Breeding
Fenian was bred by August Belmont and was a chestnut stallion. His sire was Mickey Free. His dam was the imported mare Spiletta by Stockwell, and his second dam was Olivia Augusta by Cowl. Fenian was Spiletta's only stakes winning foal. Mickey Free was an imported stallion, sired by Irish Birdcatcher and out of the mare Annie by Wanderer. Fenian was his only stakes winning foal. The American Stud Book gives his original name as "Leonardo".

Racing career
Fenian raced as a two-year-old and was held to be a good racehorse then. He started five times and won twice. On June 10, 1868, he placed third in the Hopeful Stakes, a  race for two-year-olds. Seven days later, he placed second in a  sweepstakes race for two-year-olds. He was again second in a two-year-old sweepstakes race on July 1, this time at a distance of 5 furlongs. His record as a two-year-old was two wins, two seconds, and a third from five races.

Fenian won the third running of the Belmont Stakes in 1869 for his owner August Belmont. His trainer was Jacob Pincus and he won the race in a time of 3 minutes and 4.25 seconds. The track was rated as heavy, and the race was at a distance of  miles (i.e. ) on June 5. The race was worth $3500 to the winner, who was ridden by Charlie Miller. Although there is no official record of the margin of victory, contemporary accounts noted that Fenian won the race easily, and finished the race while being pulled up. The race was run at Jerome Park. His stablemate, Glenelg, was also entered in the race, and there is some indication that Glenelg was held back to allow Fenian to win. Glenelg, also owned by Belmont, came in second in the race. Fenian, however, had been bred by Belmont, and Glenelg, who was imported to the United States in his mother's womb, had not, so Belmont preferred for a horse he had bred to win. There were 6 other horses in the race, but none of them came close to beating either Fenian or Glenelg. This was Fenian's only race as a three-year-old.

Fenian reportedly never raced again, due to bad legs. This was a fault of all of his dam's foals. However, Belmont sold Fenian in October 1870 to Dr. D. Kerwin for $70.  He later raced under Kerwin's name as a gelding until 1872 when he was sent to England. Retrained for steeplechasing and owned by J.B. Burstall, Fenian was second in the Military and Navy Stakes run at Emsworth in April 1872.

Fenian won no other stakes races, and sired no stakes winners. His claim to fame is that he is the horse that appears on top of the Belmont Stakes trophy.

Pedigree

Citations

References

External links
 Fenian's pedigree at Pedigree Online Thoroughbred Database

1866 racehorse births
Racehorses trained in the United States
Racehorses bred in New York (state)
Belmont Stakes winners
Thoroughbred family 1-a